School Ties is a 1992 American drama film directed by Robert Mandel and starring Brendan Fraser, Matt Damon, Chris O'Donnell, Randall Batinkoff, Andrew Lowery, Cole Hauser, Ben Affleck, and Anthony Rapp. Fraser plays the lead role as David Greene, a Jewish high school student who is awarded an athletic scholarship to an elite preparatory school in his senior year.

Plot
In September of 1955, working-class Jewish 17-year-old David Greene, from Scranton, Pennsylvania, receives a football scholarship to St. Matthew's Academy, an exclusive Massachusetts prep school, for his senior year because of his excellent grades and exceptional ability to play football. However, before arriving at school, David gets into an alleyway fight with a nearby motorcycle gang, which leaves him with a bruised forehead. Upon arrival, he meets his teammates Rip Van Kelt, Charlie Dillon, Jack Connors, McGivern, and his roommate Chris Reese, the most well-known and popular students who are from well-to-do families, and learns of the school's cherished honor code system. After learning that his newfound friends, as well as the majority of staff and students at this preparatory school, have wide spread, negative and stereotypical views about Jews,  he chooses to not reveal his religion to them.

David quickly becomes the football team's hero and attracts beautiful débutante Sally Wheeler, who Dillon "claims" is his girlfriend. After a victory over the school's chief rival St. Luke's, an intoxicated teacher accidentally reveals David's Judaism to Charlie.  Out of jealousy, Dillon tells the rest of the football team about this in the shower room and David challenges him to a fight which results in Dillon getting a bloody nose. Soon, David's Judaism becomes the centre of attention, causing Sally and most of the other students to turn against David. David's classmates, led by Richard "McGoo" Collins and his bodyguard-like roommate Chesty Smith, constantly harass him, with only Reese and another unnamed student remaining loyal. The final straw comes when he finds a sign above his bed bearing a Nazi flag and the words "Go home Jew." Finally having enough, he furiously makes a public confrontation against everyone and demands whoever made the sign to meet him outside the building the following night. No one shows up, however, and David calls out the students' cowardice when he sees them looking out their dorm windows.

Overwhelmed by pressure from his prestigious family, Dillon uses a crib sheet to cheat on an important American History exam. David and Rip Van Kelt spot him doing so, but choose to not report him. After the exam, Dillon gets bumped into by another student when leaving the History class and accidentally drops the cheat sheet onto the floor. When the teacher, Mr. Geirasch, finds it, he informs the class that he will fail all of them if the cheater does not come forward. He instructs the students, led by Van Kelt, the head prefect, to convince the cheater to turn themselves in to the headmaster's office.

When David confronts Dillon and threatens to turn him in himself if he does not confess to cheating on the History exam, Dillon tells David about the pressure he is facing and apologizes for conspiring against him and unsuccessfully attempts to bribe David into being silent. Later just when David is about to reveal Dillon as the cheater to the rest of the students at the table, Dillon gets up and publicly accuses David of being the cheater. They try to fight each other but Van Kelt stops it and tells them to leave and let the rest of the class decide who is being honest. Both agree to do so, although Reese tries to convince David not to because he says the rest of the class will be prejudiced against him. The majority of the class blame David out of antisemitic prejudice, while Reese, the unnamed student, and Connors, going against his own self-professed antisemitism, argue that it is unlike David to cheat and lie. Despite this, the class votes to convict David, prompting Van Kelt to tell him to report to the headmaster, Dr. Bartram, to confess to the cheating.

David goes to Bartram's office and says that he was the cheater. Unbeknownst to him, Van Kelt has already told the headmaster that the real offender was Dillon. Bartram tells David and Van Kelt that they should have reported the offense, but he absolves the both of them.  David then angrily states that he will use this school as a springboard to further his education, the same way the school is using him for football. As David leaves the headmaster's office, he sees an expelled Dillon leaving the school. Dillon says that he will be accepted to Harvard anyway and that years later everybody will have forgotten about his incident, but David still will be a "Goddamn Jew". David laughs him off and says to Dillon that he still will be a "prick," and walks away.

Cast

Filming

Most of the movie was filmed on location at Middlesex School in Concord, Massachusetts. The scene at the bus depot in Scranton, Pennsylvania, was filmed at a liquor store (the former train station) in Leominster, Massachusetts. The scene at Skip's Blue Moon Diner was filmed in downtown Gardner, Massachusetts. In addition, Groton School, Worcester Academy, Lawrence Academy at Groton and St. Mark's School (all area prep schools) were involved in the filming.

Opening scenes are of the south and west sides of Wyandotte Street (Route 378 heading north), the Bethlehem Steel Plant and Zion Lutheran Church from the top of the graveyard looking northwest to 4th Street in Bethlehem, Pennsylvania. The opening credits scene showing the Mobile Station, Chip's Diner and the Roxy Theatre were filmed on Main Street in Northampton, Pennsylvania. The opening credits scene in front of Dana's Luncheonette and some scenes inside were filmed in Lowell, Massachusetts. The middle dinner and dancing scene was filmed at the Lanam Club in Andover, Massachusetts.

Release

Box office
The film was a commercial failure, only grossing $14.7 million at the box office against a budget of $18 million. Despite this, the film is remembered as providing some of the first major cinema lead roles for many of its cast, including Fraser, Affleck and Damon.

Critical reception
School Ties has a 60% approval rating on Rotten Tomatoes based on 40 reviews with the consensus: "Led by an A+ cast, the road to School Ties is paved with good intentions that are somewhat marred by the honorable yet heavy-handed message against intolerance." 

Roger Ebert of the Chicago Sun-Times found the film "surprisingly effective", whereas Janet Maslin of The New York Times found it followed a "predictable path". Peter Rainer of the Los Angeles Times wrote that he wished that David Greene could have been made a more imperfect character.

Home media
The film was released on Blu-ray for the first time by Imprint in the fall of 2022.

References

External links

 
 
 
 

1992 films
1992 drama films
1990s coming-of-age drama films
1990s English-language films
1990s high school films
1990s teen drama films
American coming-of-age drama films
American high school films
American teen drama films
Antisemitism in the United States
Films set in boarding schools
Films about antisemitism
Films about bullying
Films directed by Robert Mandel
Films scored by Maurice Jarre
Films set in 1959
Films set in Massachusetts
Films set in Pennsylvania
Films shot in Massachusetts
Films shot in Allentown, Pennsylvania
High school football films
Paramount Pictures films
1990s American films